Marck may refer to:

Surname 
 Érard de La Marck (1472–1538), prince-bishop of Liège
 Jan van der Marck (1929–2010) Dutch-born American art historian, and museum curator.
 John T. Marck, Beatles biographer who suggested that "Real Love", which reunited the Beatles, may have its origins in a John and Yoko stage play concept
 Robert III de La Marck (1491–1537), marshal of France and historian
 William I de La Marck (1446–1485), had Prince-Bishop of Liège assassinated, which started a civil war
 William II de La Marck (1542–1578), Lord of Lumey and initially admiral of the Gueux de mer

Other 
 Marck, Pas-de-Calais, a commune in northern France
 AS Marck, association football club based in Marck
 County of Mark or Marck, a former county in southern Westphalia, Germany